The English Chamber Orchestra (ECO) is a British chamber orchestra based in London. The full orchestra regularly plays concerts at Cadogan Hall, and their ensemble performs at Wigmore Hall. The orchestra regularly tours in the UK and internationally, and holds the distinction of not only having the most extensive discography of any chamber orchestra, but also of being the most well-traveled orchestra in the world; no other orchestra has played concerts (as of 2013, according to its own publicity) in as many countries as the English Chamber Orchestra.

The English Chamber Orchestra has its origins in the Goldsbrough Orchestra, founded in 1948 by Lawrence Leonard and Arnold Goldsbrough. The group took its current name in 1960, when it expanded its repertoire beyond the Baroque period for the first time. Its repertoire remained limited by the group's size, which has stayed fairly consistently at around the size of an orchestra of Mozart's time.

Shortly afterwards, it became closely associated with the Aldeburgh Festival, playing in the premieres of Benjamin Britten's A Midsummer Night's Dream (1960), Owen Wingrave (1970), Curlew River and several other of his works. The occasions on which Britten conducted the orchestra included the opening concerts of the Queen Elizabeth Hall and Snape Maltings in 1967. He also made a number of records with the group.

The orchestra did not at this time have a principal conductor, but worked closely with a succession of guest conductors including Raymond Leppard, Colin Davis and Daniel Barenboim. In 1985 Jeffrey Tate was appointed the ensemble's first principal conductor.  In 2000, Ralf Gothóni was appointed second principal conductor.

In June 2009, the English Chamber Orchestra named Paul Watkins its new music director, effective with the 2009–2010 season, for an initial contract of three years.

Recordings
Murray Perahia's first major recording project was Mozart's 27 piano concertos, conducted from the keyboard with the English Chamber Orchestra.

 Mozart and Myslivecek Flute Concertos. Ana de la Vega. PENTATONE PTC 5186723 (2018).

References

External links
English Chamber Orchestra homepage

Musical groups established in 1948
London orchestras
Chamber orchestras
1948 establishments in England